Josy Kraus (11 December 1908 – 8 December 2001) was a Luxembourgian racing cyclist. He rode in the 1936 Tour de France.

References

1908 births
2001 deaths
Luxembourgian male cyclists
Place of birth missing